Stephen Freese (born March 16, 1960) is an American Republican politician from Wisconsin.

Born in Dubuque, Iowa, he went to high school in Hazel Green, Wisconsin and graduated from University of Wisconsin–Platteville. He served as a town officer and on the Grant County, Wisconsin. Freese served in the Wisconsin State Assembly from 1991 until 2007, when he was defeated in 2006.

Notes

Politicians from Dubuque, Iowa
People from Grant County, Wisconsin
Members of the Wisconsin State Assembly
County supervisors in Wisconsin
1960 births
Living people
21st-century American politicians